Sultanapur is a village in Dharwad district of Karnataka, India.

Demographics 
As of the 2011 Census of India there were 305 households in Sultanapur and a total population of 1,467 consisting of 734 males and 733 females. There were 157 children ages 0-6.

References

Villages in Dharwad district